Stephanie Eggink (born July 12, 1988) is an American mixed martial artist, who currently competes in the Strawweight division of the all-female promotion Invicta FC. A professional competitor since 2011, Eggink holds a record of 4–3, and is the former XFC Strawweight Champion.

Mixed martial arts career

Amateur career
Eggink had her first amateur mixed martial arts bout on July 2, 2010, when she faced Jillian Lybarger at Tuff-N-Uff: Tough Girls. She won the bout via third round triangle choke. Following this, Eggink would go 3–1 as an amateur, and also unsuccessfully challenged for the Amateur Tuff-N-Uff Flyweight Championship, losing the championship bout against Jenny Yum via split decision. She would turn professional in early 2011. In March 2012, she suffered a humiliating loss to Kaline Medeiros after getting knocked out just seven seconds into the fight. Eggink suffered a Level 4 concussion and was unable to create new memories for a day.

Xtreme Fighting Championships
After a 1–1 stint on the regional circuit, Eggink signed with Florida based promotion Xtreme Fighting Championships. Eggink faced Heather Clark in her debut at XFC 21: Night of Champions 2 on December 7, 2012. She won the fight via unanimous decision.

In her second bout with the promotion, Eggink faced Brianna Van Buren at XFC 23: Louisville Slugfest on April 19, 2013. She won the fight via unanimous decision.

For her next bout in the promotion, she challenged Angela Magaña for the XFC Strawweight Championship at XFC 25: Boiling Point on September 6, 2013. She won the championship fight via second round triangle choke.

Invicta FC
Following her impressive championship win, Eggink would vacate the XFC Strawweight Championship and subsequently signed with the all-female promotion Invicta FC. She faced Katja Kankaanpää for the vacant Strawweight Championship at Invicta FC 8: Waterson vs. Tamada on September 6, 2014. Eggink lost the bout via fifth round D'Arce choke, and both fighters would earn Fight of the Night honors for their efforts.

Eggink was expected to face Alexa Grasso at Invicta FC 16: Hamasaki vs. Brown on March 11, 2016. Grasso withdrew with an injury on March 2 and was replaced by Angela Hill. She lost the fight by a second-round technical knockout.

Championships and accomplishments

Mixed martial arts
Invicta Fighting Championships
Fight of the Night (One time) vs. Katja Kankaanpää 
Xtreme Fighting Championships
XFC Strawweight Championship (One time)

Mixed martial arts record

|-
|Loss
|align=center| 4–3
|Angela Hill
|TKO (punch)
|Invicta FC 16: Hamasaki vs. Brown
|
|align=center|2
|align=center|2:36
|Las Vegas, Nevada, United States
|
|-
|Loss
|align=center| 4–2
|Katja Kankaanpää
|Submission (D'Arce choke)
|Invicta FC 8: Waterson vs. Tamada
|
|align=center|5
|align=center|2:03
|Kansas City, Missouri, United States
|
|-
|Win
|align=center| 4–1
|Angela Magaña
|Submission (triangle choke)
|XFC 25: Boiling Point
|
|align=center|2
|align=center|3:10
|Albuquerque, New Mexico, United States
|
|-
|Win
|align=center| 3–1
|Brianna Van Buren
|Decision (unanimous)
|XFC 23: Louisville Slugfest
|
|align=center|3
|align=center|5:00
|Louisville, Kentucky, United States
|
|-
|Win
|align=center| 2–1
|Heather Clark
|Decision (unanimous)
|XFC 21 - Night of Champions 2
|
|align=center|3
|align=center|5:00
|Nashville, Tennessee, United States
|
|-
|Loss
|align=center| 1–1
|Kaline Medeiros
|KO (punch)
|EB: Beatdown at 4 Bears 10
|
|align=center|1
|align=center|0:07
|New Town, North Dakota, United States
|
|-
|Win
|align=center| 1–0
|Trisha Clark
|Submission (armbar)
|Crowbar MMA: Rumble at the Fair
|
|align=center|1
|align=center|2:21
|Grand Forks, North Dakota, United States
|
|-

References

External links

1988 births
Sportspeople from Miami
Living people
American female mixed martial artists
Flyweight mixed martial artists
Strawweight mixed martial artists
Mixed martial artists from Florida
21st-century American women